Rouwen Hennings (born 28 August 1987) is a German professional footballer who plays as a forward for  club Fortuna Düsseldorf.

Hennings has previously played for Hamburger SV, VfL Osnabrück, FC St. Pauli, and Karlsruher SC in the Bundesliga, 2. Bundesliga, and 3. Liga. He has played international football for Germany's under-19, under-20, and under-21 level, making 21 caps and scoring 13 goals for the latter.

Club career

Hennings started his career with local junior side VfL Oldesloe before signing for Hamburger SV in 2001. He progressed through the junior sides to be promoted to the first team in 2005. He featured mainly for the second side in the Regionalliga Nord, making 22 appearances in the 2005–06 season and 29 appearances in the 2006–07 season, before joining 2. Bundesliga side VfL Osnabrück on a season-long loan in July 2007. He struggled to score goals for Osnabrück, only scoring 2 goals in 30 appearances as the club finished in mid-table. In the summer of 2008 he was again sent out on a season-long loan to 2. Bundesliga side FC St. Pauli. He again struggled for goals, only scoring twice in 21 appearances as the side finished in 8th position, however, St. Pauli made the move permanent at the end of the season in July 2009 for €200,000.

He spent three years at St. Pauli as a permanent player winning promotion to the Bundesliga in the 2009–10 season as the side finished runners-up in the 2. Bundesliga, with Hennings scoring 9 goals in 29 appearances. St. Pauli only lasted one season in the Bundesliga, finishing in last place and Hennings struggled to make an impact, only making 16 appearances. During the 2011–12 season back in the 2. Bundesliga, Hennings struggled to break into the first team, making only seven appearances, and in January 2012 he was sent out on loan to former club VfL Osnabrück in the 3. Liga. He found some goalscoring form at Osnabrück scoring five in seventeen.

In June 2012, he signed for 3. Liga side Karlsruher SC for €50,000 and won promotion to 2. Bundesliga in his first season with the club as they finished as champions. Karlsruher SC made a good return to the second division finishing in 5th place as Hennings scored 10 goals in 31 appearances. In his final season with the club he finished as top scorer in the league with 17 goals as Karlsruher SC narrowly missed out on automatic promotion and finished in third position, qualifying for the play-offs. Hennings went on to score once more in the 3–2 aggregate play-off defeat to his former club Hamburger SV. He made a total of 102 appearances for Karlsruher SC scoring 37 goals.

In the summer of 2015 he was in high demand across Europe, being linked with a move back for former club Hamburger SV and also to SV Werder Bremen, whilst there was also an offer from Greek side PAOK FC, where Frank Arnesen was sporting director. In July 2015, Football League Championship side Sheffield Wednesday had a bid rejected for Hennings, but in August 2015 fellow Championship side Burnley signed him on a three-year contract for an undisclosed fee. Hennings scored his first goal for the club in a 2–2 draw with Cardiff City on 28 November 2015.

Despite having made regular substitute appearances during Burnley's Championship-winning campaign in 2015–16, he did not feature in the Premier League the following season. Instead, he was loaned out for the duration of the 2016–17 season, returning to his homeland to play for Fortuna Düsseldorf. Hennings made 30 appearances and scored nine goals as the club finished 11th in the 2. Bundesliga. On 7 July 2017, it was announced that he had returned to Düsseldorf on a permanent basis after being granted a free transfer by Burnley.

At Fortuna Düsseldorf for the 2017–18 season, he played a key role in helping them gain promotion to the Bundesliga.

International career
Hennings has represented Germany at under-19, under-20 and under-21 level. He first represented Germany at under-19 level in October 2005 whilst playing in the qualifiers for the 2006 UEFA European Under-19 Championship. He gained five caps at this level scoring twice in a 3–2 victory over Greece as Germany failed to qualify for the main tournament. Hennings also gained three caps at under-20 level in 2007, scoring in friendly international victories over Switzerland and Austria. He made his debut for the under-21 side in February 2007, replacing Marcel Heller as a substitute in the 0–0 draw with Italy. He featured heavily in the qualification for the 2009 UEFA European Under-21 Championship, finishing as joint top scorer in the qualifiers with seven goals. He scored braces against Israel and Luxembourg, and also scored against Northern Ireland and Moldova. Despite being top goalscorer, Hennings could not force himself into the squad for the final tournament and finished his under-21 career with 21 appearances and 13 goals.

Career statistics

Honours
FC St. Pauli
2. Bundesliga runners-up: 2009–10

Karslruher SC
3. Liga champions: 2012–13

Burnley
Football League Championship champions: 2015–16

Fortuna Düsseldorf
2. Bundesliga champions: 2017–18

Individual
2. Bundesliga top goalscorer: 2014–15 (17)

References

External links
 
 

1987 births
Living people
People from Bad Oldesloe
German footballers
Footballers from Schleswig-Holstein
Association football forwards
Hamburger SV players
Hamburger SV II players
FC St. Pauli players
VfL Osnabrück players
Karlsruher SC players
Burnley F.C. players
Fortuna Düsseldorf players
Bundesliga players
2. Bundesliga players
3. Liga players
Regionalliga players
English Football League players
Germany under-21 international footballers
German expatriate footballers
German expatriate sportspeople in England
Expatriate footballers in England